Pingxiang is a county-level city under the administration of the prefecture-level city of Chongzuo, in the southwest of the Guangxi Zhuang Autonomous Region, China.

Situation

It is bordered in the north by Longzhou County and in the east by Ningming County, both in Chongzuo, and in the south and west by Vietnam's Lạng Sơn Province.

National Route 322 comes through the city centre, as does the railway which continues on to Hanoi; a high-speed expressway, now also international, passes nearby.

Zhennan Pass, site of the Battle of Bang Bo during the Sino-French War, is now named the "Friendship Pass" and is considered the gateway to Vietnam.

There are also plans to build a high-speed railway from Nanning to the Vietnamese border.

Administration

Demographics
Pingxiang has a population of approximately 106,400 (83.5% of the people belong to the Zhuang ethnic group, 2010). Ethnic groups include Zhuang, Han, Yao, Miao, Jing, and others.

Towns (zhen)
 Pingxiang
 Shangshi
 Xiashi
 Youyi

Transportation

Rail
 Hunan–Guangxi Railway

Climate

See also
 Lang Son

Notes and references

County-level divisions of Guangxi
China–Vietnam border crossings
Chongzuo
Cities in Guangxi